Zahariev Peak is a rocky, partly ice-free peak rising to 816 m in Metlichina Ridge on Oscar II Coast, Graham Land in Antarctica.  It overlooks Punchbowl Glacier to the northeast and Borima Bay to the southwest.

The feature is named after the Bulgarian meteorologist Vasil Zahariev (1929-2006) who worked at the Soviet base Mirny in 1967–69.

Location
British mapping in 1974.

Maps
 Antarctic Digital Database (ADD). Scale 1:250000 topographic map of Antarctica. Scientific Committee on Antarctic Research (SCAR). Since 1993, regularly upgraded and updated.

Notes

References
 Zahariev Peak. SCAR Composite Antarctic Gazetteer.
 Bulgarian Antarctic Gazetteer. Antarctic Place-names Commission. (details in Bulgarian, basic data in English)

External links
 Zahariev Peak. Copernix satellite image

Mountains of Graham Land
Oscar II Coast
Bulgaria and the Antarctic